Spectrum, 14th Century is an EP by the Canadian musician Owen Pallett, the second issued under the name of their project Final Fantasy. Pallett describes the songs as "fake field recordings" from the fictional country of Spectrum, which is also the setting of his 2010 album Heartland. Several musicians who play on the EP are also members of the indie band Beirut.

Track listing
"Oh, Spectrum" – 2:00
"Blue Imelda" – 3:36
"The Butcher" – 4:12
"Cockatrice" – 3:17
"The Ballad of No-Face" – 4:38

Personnel
Musicians
Patrick Borjal
Perrin Cloutier
Paul Collins
Zach Condon
Kristin Ferebee
Jessica Kepler
Jon Natchez
Owen Pallett
Richard Reed Perry
Nick Petree
Kelly Pratt
Tracy Pratt
Production
Recorded by Mark Lawson
Mastered by George Graves
Written and arranged by Owen Pallett
Design by Colin Bergh
Printed by Standard Form

References

Owen Pallett albums
2008 EPs